Club Atlético de Madrid, S.A.D. (meaning "Athletic Club of Madrid"), known simply as Atleti in the Spanish-speaking world and commonly referred to at international level as Atlético Madrid, is a Spanish professional football club based in Madrid that plays in La Liga. The club play their home games at the Metropolitano, which has a capacity of 68,456.

In terms of league titles won, Atlético Madrid are the third most successful club in Spanish football—behind Real Madrid and Barcelona. Atlético have won La Liga on eleven occasions, including a league and cup double in 1996; the Copa del Rey on ten occasions; two Supercopas de España, one
 and one Copa Eva Duarte; in Europe, they won the European Cup Winners' Cup in 1962, were runners-up in 1963 and 1986, were UEFA Champions League runners-up in 1974, 2014 and 2016, won the Europa League in 2010, 2012 and 2018, and won the UEFA Super Cup in 2010, 2012 and 2018 as well as the 1974 Intercontinental Cup.
 
Atlético's home kit is red and white vertical striped shirts, blue shorts, and blue and red socks. This combination has been used since 1911. Throughout their history the club has been known by a number of nicknames, including Los Colchoneros ("The Mattress Makers"), due to their first team stripes being the same colours as traditional mattresses. During the 1970s, they became known as Los Indios, which some attribute to the club's signing several South American players after the restrictions on signing foreign players were lifted. However, there are a number of alternative theories which claim they were named so because their stadium was "camped" on the river bank, or because Los Indios (The Indians) were the traditional enemy of Los Blancos (The Whites), which is the nickname of the club's city rivals, Real Madrid. Felipe VI, the king of Spain, has been the honorary president of the club since 2003.

History

Foundation and first years (1903–1939) 

The club was founded on 26 April 1903 as Athletic Club Sucursal de Madrid by three Basque students living in Madrid. These founders saw the new club as a youth branch of their childhood team, Athletic Bilbao who they had just seen win the 1903 Copa del Rey Final in the city. In 1904, they were joined by dissident members of Real Madrid. The side began playing in blue and white halved shirts, the then colours of Athletic Bilbao, but by 1911, both the Bilbao and Madrid teams were playing in their current colours of red and white stripes. Some believe the change came about because red and white striped tops were the cheapest to make, as the same combination was used to make ticking for mattresses, and the unused cloth was easily converted into football shirts. This contributed to the club's nickname, Los Colchoneros.

However, another explanation is that both Athletic Bilbao and Athletic Madrid used to buy Blackburn Rovers' blue and white kits in England. In late 1909, Juanito Elorduy, a former player and member of the board of Athletic Madrid, went to England to buy kits for both teams but failed to find Blackburn kits to purchase; he instead bought the red and white shirts of Southampton F.C. (the club from the port city which was his embarkation point back to Spain). Athletic Madrid adopted the red and white shirt, leading to them being known as Los Rojiblancos, but opted to keep their existing blue shorts whereas the Bilbao team switched to new black shorts. Athletic Bilbao won the 1911 Copa del Rey Final using several 'borrowed' players from Athletic Madrid, including  who scored one of their goals.

Athletic's first ground, the Ronda de Vallecas, was in the eponymous working-class area on the south side of the city. In 1919, the Compañía Urbanizadora Metropolitana—the company that ran the underground communication system in Madrid—acquired some land, near the Ciudad Universitaria. In 1921, Athletic Madrid became independent of parent-club Athletic Bilbao and moved into a 35,800-seater stadium built by the company, the Estadio Metropolitano de Madrid. The Metropolitano was used until 1966, when they moved to the new Estadio Vicente Calderón. After the move, the Metropolitano was demolished and was replaced with university buildings and an office block belonging to the company ENUSA.

During the 1920s, Athletic won the Campeonato del Centro three times and were Copa del Rey runners-up in 1921, where they faced parent club Athletic Bilbao, as they would again in 1926. Based on these successes, in 1928 they were invited to join the Primera División of the inaugural La Liga played the following year. During their debut La Liga campaign, the club was managed by Fred Pentland, but after two seasons they were relegated to Segunda División. They briefly returned to La Liga in 1934 but were relegated again in 1936 after Josep Samitier took over in mid-season from Pentland. The Spanish Civil War gave Los Colchoneros a reprieve, as Real Oviedo was unable to play due to the destruction of their stadium during the bombings. Thus, both La Liga and Athletic's relegation were postponed, the latter by winning a playoff against Osasuna, champion of the Segunda División tournament.

Athletic Aviación de Madrid (1939–1947) 
By 1939, when La Liga had resumed, Athletic had merged with Aviación Nacional of Zaragoza to become Athletic Aviación de Madrid. Aviación Nacional had been founded in 1937 by three aviation officers of the Spanish Air Force. They had been promised a place in the Primera División for the 1939–40 season, only to be denied by the RFEF, and since they did not want to go through the whole divisional climb up, this club merged with Athletic, whose squad had lost eight players during the Civil War, including the team's star, Monchín Triana, who was shot dead. At that time, Real Oviedo also had its field destroyed by the war, so it was decided to give up its place to another team, and that final spot was contested by Aviación and CA Osasuna, in a match in Valencia on 26 November 1939, which Aviación won 3–1. With the legendary Ricardo Zamora as manager, the club subsequently won their first La Liga title that season and retained the title in 1941. The most influential and charismatic player of these years was the captain Germán Gómez, who was signed from Racing de Santander in 1939. He played eight consecutive seasons for the Rojiblancos until the 1947–48 campaign. From his central midfield position, he formed a legendary midfield alongside Machín and Ramón Gabilondo.

In mid-1940, a decree issued by Francisco Franco banned teams from using foreign names and the club became Atlético Aviación de Madrid. In September 1940, Atlético Aviación won the very first Super cup in Spanish football after beating RCD Español, the 1940 Copa del Generalísimo winners, in a two-legged game that ended in a 10–4 aggregate victory, including a 7–1 trashing in the second leg at Campo de Fútbol de Vallecas. On 14 December 1946, the club decided to drop the military association from its name, and shortly after, on 6 January, it settled on its current name of Club Atlético de Madrid. Also in 1947, Atlético beat Real Madrid 5–0 at the Metropolitano, their biggest win over their cross-town rivals to date.

Golden age (1947–1965) 

Under Helenio Herrera and with the help of Larbi Benbarek, Atlético won La Liga again in 1950 and 1951. With the departure of Herrera in 1953, the club began to slip behind Real Madrid and Barcelona and for the remainder of the 1950s were left to battle it out with Athletic Bilbao for the title of third team in Spain.

However, during the 1960s and 1970s, Atlético Madrid seriously challenged Barcelona for the position of second team. The 1957–58 season saw Ferdinand Daučík take charge of Atlético, where he led them to second place in La Liga. This resulted in Atlético qualifying for the 1958–59 European Cup since the winners, Real Madrid, were the reigning European champions. Inspired by Brazilian centre-forward Vavá and Enrique Collar, Atlético reached the semi-finals after beating Drumcondra, CSKA Sofia and Schalke 04. In the semi-finals, they met Real Madrid, who won the first leg 2–1 at the Santiago Bernabéu while Atlético won 1–0 at the Metropolitano. The tie went to a replay and Real won 2–1 in Zaragoza.

Atlético, however, gained their revenge when, led by former Real coach José Villalonga, they defeated Real in two successive Copa del Rey finals in 1960 and 1961. In 1962, they won the European Cup Winners' Cup, beating Fiorentina 3–0 after a replay. This achievement was significant for the club, as the Cup Winners' Cup was the only major European trophy that Real Madrid never won. The following year the club reached the 1963 final, but lost to English side Tottenham Hotspur 5–1. Enrique Collar, who continued to be an influential player during this era, was now joined by the likes of midfielder Miguel Jones and midfield playmaker Adelardo.

Atlético's best years coincided with dominant Real Madrid teams. Between 1961 and 1980, Real Madrid dominated La Liga, winning the competition 14 times. During this era, only Atlético offered Real any serious challenge, winning La Liga titles in 1966, 1970, 1973 and 1977 and finishing runners-up in 1961, 1963 and 1965. The club had further success winning the Copa del Rey on three occasions in 1965, 1972 and 1976. In 1965, when they finished as La Liga runners-up to Real after an intense battle for the title, Atlético became the first team to beat Real at the Bernabéu in eight years.

European Cup Finalists (1965–1974) 

Atlético left the Estadio Metropolitano de Madrid and moved to a new home in the Manzanares river waterfront, the Vicente Calderón Stadium, which was inaugurated on 2 October 1966 with a fixture against Valencia.

Significant players from this era included the now-veteran Adelardo and regular goalscorers Luis Aragonés, Javier Irureta and José Eulogio Gárate, the latter winning the Pichichi three times in 1969, 1970 and 1971. In the 1970s, Atlético also recruited several Argentine players, signing Rubén Ayala, Panadero Díaz and Ramón "Cacho" Heredia as well as coach Juan Carlos Lorenzo. Lorenzo believed in discipline, caution and disrupting the opponents' game, and although controversial, his methods proved successful—after winning La Liga in 1973, the club reached the 1974 European Cup Final. On the way to the Final, Atlético knocked out Galatasaray, Dinamo București, Red Star Belgrade and Celtic. In the away leg of the semi-final against Celtic, Atlético had Ayala, Díaz and substitute Quique all sent off during a hard-fought encounter in what was reported as one of the worst cases of cynical fouling the tournament has seen. Because of this cynicism, they managed a 0–0 draw, which was followed by a 2–0 victory in the return leg with goals from Gárate and Adelardo. The Final at Heysel Stadium, however, was a loss for Atlético. Against a Bayern Munich team that included Franz Beckenbauer, Sepp Maier, Paul Breitner, Uli Hoeneß and Gerd Müller, Atlético played above themselves. Despite missing Ayala, Díaz and Quique through suspension, they went ahead in extra-time with only seven minutes left. Aragonés scored with a superb, curling free-kick that looked like the winner, but in the last minute of the game, Bayern defender Georg Schwarzenbeck equalized with a stunning 25-yarder that left Atlético goalkeeper Miguel Reina motionless. In a replay back at Heysel two days later, Bayern won convincingly 4–0, with two goals each from Hoeneß and Müller.

The Aragonés years (1974–1987) 

Shortly after the defeat in the 1974 European Cup Final, Atlético appointed their veteran player Luis Aragonés as coach. Aragonés subsequently served as coach on four separate occasions, from 1974 to 1980, from 1982 to 1987, once again from 1991 until 1993 and finally from 2002 to 2003. His first success came quickly as Bayern Munich had refused to participate in the Intercontinental Cup because of fixture congestion, and as European Cup runners-up, Atlético were invited instead. Their opponents were Independiente of Argentina and, after losing the away leg 1–0, they won the return leg 2–0 with goals from Javier Irureta and Rubén Ayala. Aragonés subsequently led the club to further successes in the Copa del Rey in 1976 and La Liga in 1977.

During his second spell in charge, Aragonés led the club to a runners-up finish in La Liga and a winner's medal in the Copa del Rey, both in 1985. He received considerable help from Hugo Sánchez, who scored 19 league goals and won the Pichichi. Sánchez also scored twice in the cup final as Atlético beat Athletic Bilbao 2–1. Sánchez, however, only remained at the club for one season before his move across the city to Real Madrid. Despite the loss of Sánchez, Aragonés went on to lead the club to success in the Supercopa de España in 1985 and then guided them to the European Cup Winners' Cup final in 1986. Atlético, however, lost their third successive European final, this time 3–0 to Dynamo Kyiv.

The Transition years (1987–2005) 

In 1987, controversial politician and businessman Jesús Gil became club president, running the club (and committing a fraud of misappropriation by seizing 95% of the shares while failing to effectively pay a single Peseta during the Atlético's forced conversion from fan-owned club to Sociedad Anónima Deportiva in 1992) until his resignation in May 2003.

Atlético had not won La Liga for 10 years and were desperate for league success. Right away, Gil spent heavily, bringing in a number of expensive signings, most notably Portuguese winger Paulo Futre, who had just won the European Cup with Porto. All the spending, however, only brought in two consecutive Copa del Rey trophies in 1991 and 1992 as the league title proved elusive. The closest Atlético came to the La Liga trophy was the 1990–91 season when they finished runners-up by 10 points to Johan Cruyff's Barcelona. In the process, Gil developed a ruthless reputation due to the manner in which he ran the club. In pursuit of league success, he hired and fired a number of high-profile head coaches, including César Luis Menotti, Ron Atkinson, Javier Clemente, Tomislav Ivić, Francisco Maturana, Alfio Basile as well as club legend Luis Aragonés.

Jesús Gil also closed down Atlético's youth academy in 1992, a move that would prove significant due to 15-year-old academy member Raúl who, as a result, went across town to later achieve worldwide fame with rivals Real Madrid. The move came as part of the overall Gil-initiated business restructuring of the club; Atlético became a Sociedad Anónima Deportiva, a corporate structure benefiting from a then-recently introduced special legal status under Spanish corporate law, allowing individuals to purchase and trade club shares.

In the 1994–95 league campaign, Atlético only avoided relegation via a draw on the last day of the season. This prompted another managerial change along with a wholesale squad clearance during the summer 1995 transfer window. Somewhat unexpectedly, in the following 1995–96 season, newly arrived head coach Radomir Antić, with a squad including holdovers Toni, Roberto Solozábal, Delfí Geli, Juan Vizcaíno, José Luis Caminero, Diego Simeone and Kiko, as well as new acquisitions Milinko Pantić, Luboslav Penev, Santi Denia and José Francisco Molina finally delivered the much sought-after league title as Atlético won the La Liga/Copa del Rey double.

The next season, 1996–97, saw the club take part in the UEFA Champions League for the first time. With expectations and ambitions raised, the most notable summer transfer signings were striker Juan Esnáider from Real Madrid and Radek Bejbl, who was coming off a great showing for Czech Republic at Euro 1996. Playing on two fronts, Atlético fell out of the league title contention early while, in the Champions League, they were eliminated by Ajax in extra-time in the quarter-finals. Before the 1997–98 season, the heavy spending continued with the signings of Christian Vieri and Juninho. All of the success, however, produced little change in the overall Gil strategy, and although Antić survived three consecutive seasons in charge, he was replaced during the summer of 1998 with Arrigo Sacchi, who himself only remained in the managerial hot seat for less than six months. Antić then returned briefly in early 1999 only to be replaced with Claudio Ranieri at the end of the season. The 1999–2000 season proved disastrous for Atlético. In December 1999, Gil and his board were suspended pending an investigation into the misuse of club funds, with government-appointed administrator José Manuel Rubí running Atlético's day-to-day operations. With the removal of club President Jesús Gil and his board, the players performed poorly and the club floundered. Ranieri handed in his resignation with the club sitting 17th out of 20 in the league table and heading towards relegation. Antić, returning for his third coaching stint, was unable to prevent the inevitable. Despite reaching the Copa del Rey final in 2000, Atlético were relegated second time after 66 years.

Atlético spent two seasons in the Segunda División, narrowly missing out on promotion in 2000–01 season before winning the Segunda División championship in 2002. It was again Luis Aragonés, in his fourth and last spell as manager of Atlético, who brought them back to the Primera División. He also coached the team during the next season, and gave Fernando Torres his La Liga debut.

Aguirre era (2006–2009) 

In 2006, Atlético signed Portuguese midfielders Costinha and Maniche, as well as Argentine forward Sergio Agüero. In July 2007, Fernando Torres left the club for Liverpool for €38 million, while Luis García signed for the club at the same time in an unrelated transfer. The club also bought Uruguay international and former European Golden Boot and Pichichi winner Diego Forlán for roughly €21 million from Villarreal. Other additions included Portuguese winger Simão Sabrosa from Benfica for €20 million and winger José Antonio Reyes from Arsenal for €12 million.

In July 2007, the Atlético board reached an agreement with the City of Madrid to sell the land where their stadium was located and move the club to the City-owned Olympic Stadium. The stadium changed hands in 2016 and was bought by the club for €30.4 million. Madrid had applied to host the 2016 Olympic Games, losing out to Rio de Janeiro.

The 2007–08 season proved to be the most successful season for the club in the past decade. The team reached the round of 32 in the UEFA Cup, where they were defeated by Bolton Wanderers. They also reached the quarter-final round of the Copa del Rey, where they were beaten by eventual champions Valencia. More significantly, the team finished the league season in fourth place, qualifying for the UEFA Champions League for the first time since the 1996–97 season.

On 3 February 2009, Javier Aguirre was dismissed from his post as manager after a poor start to the season, going without a win in six games. He later claimed that this was not accurate, and that he had left by mutual termination rather than through sacking. There was public outrage after his dismissal, many believing he was not the cause of Atlético's problems, namely player Diego Forlán. He backed his former manager and said that, "Dismissing Javier was the easy way out, but he was not the cause of our problems. The players are to blame because we have not been playing well and we have been committing a lot of errors." This led to the appointment of Abel Resino as Atlético's new manager.

Atlético's success continued in the latter half of the season when they placed fourth once again in the league table, securing a position in the playoff round of the UEFA Champions League. Striker Diego Forlán was crowned with the Pichichi and also won the European Golden Shoe after scoring 32 goals for Atlético that season. Atlético saw this domestic success as an opportunity to reinforce their squad for the upcoming Champions League season. They replaced veteran goalkeeper Leo Franco with David de Gea from the youth ranks and signed promising youngster Sergio Asenjo from Real Valladolid. Atlético also purchased Real Betis defender and Spanish international Juanito on a free transfer. Despite pressure from big clubs to sell star players Agüero and Forlán, Atlético remained committed to keeping their strong attacking base in the hopes for a successful new season.

The 2009–10 season, however, began poorly with many defeats and goals conceded. On 21 October, Atletico were hammered 4–0 by English club Chelsea in the Champions League group stage. This defeat led Atletico's management to announce that manager Abel Resino had to leave. After failing to sign Danish former footballer Michael Laudrup, Atlético Madrid made it official that the new manager for the rest of the season would be Quique Sánchez Flores.

La Liga and European successes (2009–) 

With the arrival of Sánchez Flores as coach in October 2009, Atlético improved in many of their competitions. Atlético continued to lag somewhat in La Liga during the 2009–10 season, finishing in ninth position, but managed to finish third in their 2009–10 UEFA Champions League group stage and subsequently entered the Europa League in the round of 32. Atlético went on to win the Europa League, beating English teams Liverpool in the semi-finals and eventually Fulham in the final held at HSH Nordbank Arena in Hamburg on 12 May 2010. Diego Forlán scored twice, the second being an extra-time winner in the 116th minute, as Atlético won 2–1.

It was the first time since the 1961–62 European Cup Winners' Cup that Atlético had claimed a European title. They also reached the Copa del Rey final on 19 May 2010, where they faced Sevilla, but lost 2–0 at Camp Nou in Barcelona. By winning the Europa League, they qualified for the 2010 UEFA Super Cup against Inter Milan, winner of the 2009–10 UEFA Champions League. The match was played in Stade Louis II, Monaco on 27 August 2010. Atlético won 2–0 with goals from José Antonio Reyes and Sergio Agüero, Atlético's first win in the UEFA Super Cup.

Atlético had a comparatively disappointing 2010–11 season, finishing only seventh in the League and being eliminated in the quarter-finals of the Copa del Rey and the group stage of the Europa League. This ultimately led to the departure of manager Sánchez Flores before the conclusion of the season, who was replaced with ex-Sevilla manager Gregorio Manzano. Manzano secured the final Europa League place for Atlético. Manzano himself was replaced with Diego Simeone in December 2011 after a poor run of form in La Liga.

Simeone led Atlético to their second Europa League win in the three years since its creation. Atlético beat Athletic Bilbao 3–0 in the final on 9 May 2012 at National Arena in Bucharest with two goals from Radamel Falcao and one from Diego. By winning the Europa League again, Atlético qualified for the 2012 UEFA Super Cup against Chelsea, winner of the previous season's Champions League. The game was played at Stade Louis II, Monaco on 31 August 2012; Atlético won 4–1, including a hat-trick by Falcao in the first half. On 17 May 2013, Atlético beat Real Madrid 2–1 in the Copa del Rey Final in a tense match where both teams finished with 10 men. This ended a 14-year and 25-match winless streak in the Madrid derby. The 2012–13 season saw the club finish with three trophies in a little over a year.

On 17 May 2014, a 1–1 draw at the Camp Nou against Barcelona secured the La Liga title for Atlético, their first since 1996, and the first title since 2003–04 not won by Barcelona or Real Madrid. One week later, Atlético faced city rivals Real Madrid in their first Champions League final since 1974, and the first played between two sides from the same city. They took a first-half lead through Diego Godín and led until the third minute of injury time, when Sergio Ramos headed in an equaliser from a corner; the match went to extra time, and Real ultimately won 4–1. Atlético reached a second Champions League final in three seasons in 2015–16, again facing Real Madrid, and lost on penalties after a 1–1 draw.

The club played their last home game at the Vicente Calderón Stadium on 21 May 2017, thereby moving to a new home, the refurbished Wanda Metropolitano in eastern Madrid.

In 2018, they won their third Europa League title in nine years by beating Marseille 3–0 in the final at Stade de Lyon in Lyon, courtesy of a brace from Antoine Griezmann and a goal from club captain Gabi in what would be his last match for the club. Atlético also won another UEFA Super Cup after beating Real Madrid 4–2 at the outset of the following season at the Lilleküla Arena in Tallinn. On 22 May 2021, a 1–2 win at the José Zorrilla Stadium against Valladolid secured the La Liga title for Atlético, seven years after their last triumph.

Recent seasons 
Statistics from the previous decade. For a full history see; List of Atlético Madrid seasons

Seasons spent at Level 1 of the Spanish League system (La Liga): 86
Seasons spent at Level 2 of the Spanish League system (Segunda División): 6

Rivalries 

Real Madrid

Real Madrid and Atlético Madrid are clubs with contrasting identities and different fates. While Real Madrid's Santiago Bernabéu proudly rises on Paseo de la Castellana in the wealthy Chamartín neighbourhood of northern Madrid, Atlético's former stadium, the less glamorous Vicente Calderón, stood in the central-south of Madrid 1.8 km from the city center in the working class barrio of Arganzuela. Historically, Real Madrid have long been seen as the establishment club. On the other side, Atlético Madrid were always characterized by a sentimiento de rebeldía, a sense of rebellion, although during the early Francisco Franco years, it was Atlético that was the preferred team of the regime. They were associated with the military airforce (renamed Atlético Aviación), until the regime's preferences moved towards Real Madrid in the 1950s.

Certainly, the dictatorial state sought to make political capital out of Real Madrid's European Cup trophies at a time when Spain was internationally isolated; "Real Madrid are the best embassy we ever had", said Franco's foreign minister Fernando Maria de Castiella. Such perceptions have had an important impact on the city's footballing identities, tapping into the collective consciousness. In this vein, Atlético fans were probably the originators, and are the most frequent singers, of the song, sung to the tune of the Real Madrid anthem, "Hala Madrid, hala Madrid, el equipo del gobierno, la vergüenza del país", "Go Madrid, go Madrid, the government's team, the country's shame."

Until recently, Atlético Madrid had struggled significantly in the derby, carrying a 14-year winless streak into the 2012–13 season. This spell ended, however, on 17 May 2013 after Atlético beat their city rivals 2–1 at the Santiago Bernabéu in the 2013 Copa del Rey Final, and continued on 29 September 2013 when they won a 1–0 victory, again at the Bernabéu.

FC Barcelona

Although less famous than the Derbi Madrileño, a historic rivalry exists between Atlético Madrid and Barcelona, which is also considered one of the "Classics" of Spanish football. Once lopsided in favor of the Catalan club, this rivalry has become competitive since the early 2010s, marked by events such as the 2016 Champions League knockout phase where Atletico Madrid upset Barcelona, the controversial departure of French striker Antoine Griezmann from the Madrid club to the Catalan club in 2019 (and his subsequent return in 2021 amid Barcelona's financial struggles), and the surprise move of Luis Suárez to Atlético in 2020, a move which saw the Uruguyan star play a crucial role in the team's championship run. However, by tradition and current affairs, the greatest rivalry is that which exists with its "merengues" neighbors.

Honours

Domestic

League 
 La Liga
 Champions (11): 1939–40, 1940–41, 1949–50, 1950–51, 1965–66, 1969–70, 1972–73, 1976–77, 1995–96, 2013–14, 2020–21
 Segunda Division
 Champions (1): 2001–02

Cups 
 Copa del Rey 
 Winners (10): 1959–60, 1960–61, 1964–65, 1971–72, 1975–76, 1984–85, 1990–91, 1991–92, 1995–96, 2012–13
Supercopa de España 
 Winners (2): 1985, 2014
  
Winners (1): 1947
Copa Eva Duarte 
 Winners (1): 1951

International 
 European Cup Winners' Cup 
 Winners (1): 1961–62
 UEFA Europa League 
 Winners (3): 2009–10, 2011–12, 2017–18
 UEFA Super Cup 
 Winners (3): 2010, 2012, 2018
 Intercontinental Cup
 Winners (1): 1974

Awards & recognitions 
Copa Stadium (Spain's oldest National Sport Award): 1962
Gold Medal (Royal Order of Sports Merit): 2014
Globe Soccer Special Award: 2014
Globe Soccer Best Club of the Year: 2012, 2018
IFFHS The World's Club Team of the Year: 2018

International competition record 

Atlético has played at the European stage regularly since its 1958–59 European Cup debut, subsequently entering the UEFA Cup Winners' Cup (1961–62), the Inter-Cities Fairs Cup (1963–64), the UEFA Cup (1971–72) and the UEFA Super Cup (2009–10). Starting with the 1999–00 relegation Atlético did not qualify for European competitions for seven years, but from the 2007–08 season, it has taken part in either the Champions League or the UEFA Europa League every year, enjoying success in both competitions.

UEFA club coefficient ranking

Players

Current squad 
.

Reserve team

Out on loan

Staff

Technical staff

Ownership and overseas properties 

Since 2002, Enrique Cerezo Torres serves as the club president, whereas  Miguel Ángel Gil Marín (son of former club president Jesús Gil) serves as chief executive officer. After a 2021 capital increase, Gil Marín, Cerezo and incoming investor Ares Management Corporation hold a 66.98% of the shares by means of 'Atlético HoldCo'.

Atlético co-owns Liga MX club Atlético San Luis, and the Canadian Premier League side Atlético Ottawa. The club also co-owned the Indian Super League (ISL) franchise in Kolkata, formerly named Atlético de Kolkata, which won the competition twice, but in 2017 ended its partnership with the club as Sanjeev Goenka bought its shares.

In October 2018, Atletico De Madrid announced their first academy in Pakistan which was based in Lahore, which was the first European football academy in Pakistan. In April 2019, they launched "Football School Program" in Lahore. In October 2019, Atletico De Madrid conducted talents in Lahore. In February 2020, Pakistan Football Federation announced the 2020–21 Football Federation League in which Atletico Madrid Lahore was included in Group C and was made a professional Pakistani football club. It made its debut against Hazara Coal and won by 2–0.

Israeli bussinsman and billionaire Idan Ofer, owns 33% of Atlético Madrid's stakes.

Stadium and facility 

The club plays home fixtures in the Cívitas Metropolitano, which was expanded from a 20,000 seat capacity (when it was known as La Peineta) to 68,000 after it was used for Madrid's failed bid to host the 2016 Summer Olympics.
Following the renovation of the stadium, the refurbished venue hosted its first competitive match pitting Atlético against Malaga CF, in which Antoine Griezmann scored the club's first goal at the stadium.

Training ground 
The club's training ground is the Ciudad Deportiva Atlético de Madrid in Majadahonda, around 20 km west of Madrid. The facility maintains grass and artificial patches as well as a gym. Both the senior and youth squads train at the club-owned facilities.

Atlético also runs a sports academy at the Ciudad Deportiva del Nuevo Cerro del Espino in Majadahonda. The club also runs an academy in Bucharest, Romania, its first in Europe.

Kit suppliers and shirt sponsors 

Atlético began playing in blue and white, mirroring then-parent club Athletic Bilbao, but both changed to red-and-white stripes by 1911 which became their traditional colours. The change took hold because red and white striped tops were the cheap to make, as the same combination was used to make bed mattresses, and the unused cloth was easily converted into football shirts. The kit has been made by Nike since 2001, as the company wants to provide competition with rival brand Adidas, who have a long-term deal with Real Madrid.

The club's main shirt sponsorship by the government of Azerbaijan between 2012 and 2014, featuring the slogan 'Land of Fire', was condemned by Reporters Without Borders, who satirized it in a campaign visual in which the shirt's vertical stripes become prison bars with the logo "Azerbaijan, Land of Repression". Atlético Madrid admitted its sponsorship deal had a political dimension, saying the intention was to "promote the image of Azerbaijan". In August 2014, the Helsinki Foundation for Human Rights wrote to Atlético, calling on it to end the sponsorship by and promotion of Azerbaijan because of the country's human rights record, calling it "one of the most repressive countries in the world".

In its 2003-4 season, the club was sponsored by Columbia Pictures, who would change the shirt sponsor's logo, and occasionally the shirt itself, as they did with the away shirt when Spider-Man 2 was in cinemas. This kit sponsorship deal featured 16 separate film titles – an unprecedented number, which has not since been replicated as of 2022. Films included Columbia Picture's 2004 film "White Chicks", which received mixed commentary. Because shirts would have to be introduced and removed from shops at a very fast pace to keep up with film releases, Nike decided to not include a sponsor's logo on replica shirts made from 2002 to 2005.

 (**) – 2003–05 Columbia Pictures (Movies advertised on the shirt included Bewitched, Hollywood Homicide, S.W.A.T., Big Fish, Hellboy, Spanglish, Resident Evil 2: Apocalypse, Hitch, xXx, and Spider-Man 2.)

Supporters 
Celebrities Joaquín Sabina, Belén Esteban, Birgitte V. Gade, Leiva, Álvaro Bautista, Omar Hittini, Ana Rosa Quintana, Javier Bardem, Sara Carbonero, Pablo Iglesias Turrión, El Langui, Pedro Sánchez, Luis de Guindos, Rosendo Mercado, José Tomás, Cayetano Martínez de Irujo, David Muñoz, Will Smith, Harrison Ford, Halle Berry, Tom Cruise, Matt Damon, Vin Diesel, Charlize Theron and Karl-Anthony Towns are all fans of the club. Atlético is also supported by King Felipe VI, who became Honorary President of the club in 2003.

Notable players 

Koke holds the club's official appearance record, wearing the Atlético shirt in 554 matches since 2009, while Adrián Escudero has the record for most goals in La Liga with 150. João Félix is the club's most expensive signing at €126 million, and at €120 million Antoine Griezmann is the club's biggest sale.

See also 

 Atlético Madrid B
 Atlético Madrid (youth)
 Atlético Madrid Femenino
 Atlético Ottawa
 Atlético San Luis
 Atlético San Luis Premier
 Atlético San Luis (women)
 Jamshedpur FC
 Tata Football Academy

References

External links 

  
 Atlético de Madrid at La Liga 
 Atlético de Madrid at UEFA 

 
1903 establishments in Spain
Association football clubs established in 1903
Copa del Rey winners
Dalian Wanda Group
Football clubs in Madrid
La Liga clubs
Military association football clubs
Multi-sport clubs in Spain
Segunda División clubs
UEFA Cup Winners' Cup winning clubs
UEFA Europa League winning clubs
UEFA Super Cup winning clubs
M